Terrence Rex Dake (born July 22, 1944) is a retired United States Marine Corps four-star general who served as Assistant Commandant of the Marine Corps (ACMC) from 1998 to 2000.

Biography 
Terrence Dake was born on July 22, 1944, in Omaha, Nebraska. He was raised in the Missouri Ozarks in Rocky Comfort, Missouri. He earned undergraduate degrees from the College of the Ozarks and the University of Arkansas, where he studied history and served as president of the Tau Kappa Epsilon fraternity chapter during the fall semester of his senior year. He holds a Master of Arts degree from Pepperdine University. He was commissioned a second lieutenant upon graduation from Officer Candidate School in October 1966. Dake was designated a Naval Aviator at Pensacola, Florida, on the January 25, 1968.

Dake logged more than 6,000 flight hours in military aircraft. Significant flying tours include a combat tour in Vietnam in 1968-69 flying CH-53A helicopters; Commanding Officer of Marine Helicopter Squadron One, designated as the President's helicopter pilot, 1983–1985; Commanding General of the 3rd Marine Aircraft Wing, July 1995 - July 1996. General Dake has flown helicopters in every aircraft wing in the Marine Corps. Additionally, he served as the Assistant Chief of Staff of Operations, G-3 for the 3rd Marine Aircraft Wing in Desert Shield and Desert Storm, the largest aircraft wing ever fielded in combat by the Marine Corps.

Dake served as the Director of Joint Training and Doctrine with the Commander-in-Chief of the United States Atlantic Command from July 1987 - July 1990.

Promoted to brigadier general in March 1992, Dake's assignments as a general officer were: Assistant Deputy Chief of Staff of Aviation; Inspector General of the Marine Corps; Deputy Commanding General, Marine Corps Combat Development Command; Commanding General, 3rd Marine Aircraft Wing and Deputy Chief of Staff for Aviation.

Dake was advanced to the rank of general and assumed his position as the Assistant Commandant of the Marine Corps on September 5, 1998. He retired on September 7, 2000.

Awards 
Dake's personal decorations include:

See also 

 Commandant of the Marine Corps

References 

1944 births
Living people
People from Omaha, Nebraska
College of the Ozarks alumni
University of Arkansas alumni
Military personnel from Missouri
United States Naval Aviators
United States Marine Corps personnel of the Vietnam War
Recipients of the Gallantry Cross (Vietnam)
Recipients of the Air Medal
Pepperdine University alumni
United States Marine Corps personnel of the Gulf War
Recipients of the Legion of Merit
United States Marine Corps generals
Assistant Commandants of the United States Marine Corps
Recipients of the Defense Superior Service Medal